Bowden railway station is located on the Grange and Outer Harbor lines. Situated in the inner-city Adelaide suburb of Bowden, it is 2.7 kilometres from Adelaide station. The station was rebuilt and reopened in January 2018, with the original platforms closed and demolished; the southbound platform was closed and demolished in April 2017, a section of the northbound platform was retained due to the original station's 1856 brick and stone station building being located on that platform, which now houses The Loose Caboose Café.

History
Bowden was one of the original stations on the Adelaide to Port Adelaide railway when the line opened in April 1856. In 1871, sidings were constructed at the Woodville end of the station for delivery of coal from Port Adelaide to the adjacent gas works. With increasing traffic, the single track Adelaide to Port Adelaide line was duplicated in 1881, and the sidings at Bowden were extended as the gas works grew. Two signal cabins were in operation at Bowden between 1884 and 1930, one at East Street (at the Woodville end), the second at Gibson Street (at the Adelaide end). The East Street cabin was closed when colour light signalling was introduced on the Port line in the 1930s.

The SA Gas Company sidings were closed in June 1973 and Bowden's goods yard was closed completely from September 1977 along with the Gibson Street signal cabin. The site of the gas works sidings is still visible on the north side of the line near the Chief Street underpass. With falling passenger numbers, the station has been unattended since November 1979, which is in marked contrast from the middle years of the 20th century when usage was high enough to justify staffed ticket offices on both platforms. In 2012, The Loose Caboose Café was opened in the station building on northbound platform 1. In late 2016, the station was ranked as one of the better stations in the western suburbs based on 5 criteria.

Redevelopment
Bowden station was significantly redeveloped as a part of the Torrens Rail Junction Project, a grade separation project to lower the Outer Harbor and Grange lines below Park Terrace, the Adelaide-Port Augusta line and Gawler line. The original city-bound platform was closed on 11 April 2017 and demolished shortly afterwards. The outbound platform was closed in September of the same year along with the entire Outer Harbor and Grange lines to facilitate main construction of the rail junction; this platform and the heritage station building containing The Loose Caboose Café were retained and the platform is now in use as a pedestrian walkway. The new Bowden station was constructed between Park Terrace and Gibson Street in the lowered cutting and was opened on 15 January 2018 along with the Outer Harbor and Grange lines.

Services by platform

Transport Connections
The closest bus stop to Bowden station is Stop 6 on Port Road:
 City - Osborne City - Westfield West Lakes City - Largs Bay

Bowden station is also in close proximity to the Entertainment Centre tram station:

 Entertainment Centre - Moseley Square (peak hour only)
 Entertainment Centre - Botanic Garden

References

Rails Through Swamp and Sand – A History of the Port Adelaide Railway M. Thompson, pub. Port Dock Station Railway Museum (1988)

External links

Railway stations in Adelaide
Railway stations in Australia opened in 1856